Zhnyborody is a village in Chortkiv Raion (district) of Ternopil Oblast (province) in western Ukraine. It belongs to Buchach urban hromada, one of the hromadas of Ukraine.

History 
First written mention comes from the 15th century, naming Niezbrody. Zhnyborody belonged to the Kingdom of Poland, the Polish–Lithuanian Commonwealth, from 1772 until 1918 to Austrian (Habsburg monarchy, Austrian Empire, Austria-Hungary) empires, in 1918-1919 to West Ukrainian People's Republic. From 1991 it belonged to Ukraine.

Until 18 July 2020, Zhnyborody belonged to Buchach Raion. The raion was abolished in July 2020 as part of the administrative reform of Ukraine, which reduced the number of raions of Ternopil Oblast to three. The area of Buchach Raion was merged into Chortkiv Raion.

Religion

Social sphere

Nature

References

Notes

Sources

External links 

Villages in Chortkiv Raion